Bauern erfüllen den Plan is an East German documentary film about the first East German Five-Year Plan. It was directed by Heiner Carow and released in 1952.

External links
 

1952 films
East German films
1950s German-language films
1950s German films